The issue of Fake News in Pakistan has become an increasing issue in the 21st century, especially within the realm of social media. The President of Pakistan, Arif Alvi, has penned an editorial for The News specifically condemning the plague of falsehoods that permeate the media and how it "created a deep sense of surprise and resentment in a population suffering from inflation and poverty".

References

Disinformation
Society of Pakistan
Fake news in Pakistan